Catherine Grace Godwin (25 December 1798 – 1845) was a  Scottish novelist, amateur painter and poet.

Biography
Catherine Grace Garnett was born in Glasgow on 15 December 1798. Her mother, Catherine Grace Cleveland, died in childbirth. Her father, Dr. Thomas Garnett, devastated by the loss of his wife  died in 1802. Godwin and her elder sister were brought up by a friend of their mother, Mary Worboys, in the village of Barbon near Kirkby Lonsdale in Westmoreland.

She began painting and writing poetry in earnest when she was fifteen but she did not publish any work until 1854. The book allowed her to become a correspondent and eventually meet William Wordsworth.

She published a romance titled Reine Canziani but she did not use her name on the cover. She did publish her best known work The Wanderer's Legacy and other poems in 1828 which she dedicated to Wordsworth.

Godwin published The Night before the Bridal and other poems before she married Thomas Godwin who had worked for the East India Company. She followed this with another book of poetry and she died in May 1845 in Barbon.

In 1854, A. Cleveland Wigan gathered together her poems and had them published with her self-portrait.

Selected works
 Alicia Grey, Or, to Be Useful Is to Be Happy
 Reine Canziani 
 Josephine, Or, Early Trials
 The Wanderer's Legacy: a Collection of Poems, on Various Subjects
 Louisa Seymour, or, Hasty Impressions
 The Reproving Angel: A Vision
 Esther More, or, Truth is Wisdom
 Basil Harlow, or Prodigality is not Generosity
 Cousin Kate, or the Punishment of Pride
 Scheming, A Tale

References

1798 births
1845 deaths
19th-century Scottish poets
19th-century British women writers
19th-century British writers
Writers from Glasgow
Scottish women poets
Scottish painters